NTX may refer to:

 NTX (group) a South Korean boy group
 Ntx (trigraph)
 N-terminal telopeptide, a biomarker used to measure the rate of bone turnover
 Nereistoxin, a natural product toxin
 Nitazoxanide, an antimicrobial drug
 North Texas
 Noxiustoxin, a scorpion toxin
 Raden Sadjad Airport (IATA: NTX), Natuna Island 
 Somra language (ISO 639:ntx), spoken in Burma